Eric Barber (1942–2014) was an Irish professional footballer.

Eric Barber may also refer to:

Eric Barber (cricketer) (1915–1995), English cricketer
 Eric Barber (English footballer) (1926–2015), English football forward with Rochdale
Eric Arthur Barber (1888–1965), Oxford college head
Eric Barber, British plumbing executive, recipient of 1990 New Year Honours
Eric Barber (basketball), American Paralympic athlete; see Wheelchair basketball at the 2000 Summer Paralympics

See also
Eric Barbour (1891–1934), Australian cricket player, physician and author
Barber (disambiguation)